Ahmed Raza Khan Kasuri Kheshgi (born 1940) is a Pakistani politician and lawyer. He is the son of Muhammad Ahmed Khan Kasuri (1903-1974) who was assassinated in a car ambush in 1974.

Early life and career
Ahmed Raza Khan Kasuri was born into the Kheshgi family of Kasur. He was educated at Central Model School, Lahore and the Government College, Lahore. He has a masters in law from the University of Cambridge, UK. He became an attorney after his education was completed. Mr. Kasuri's law firm is of considerable repute. He is considered to be one of the best legal minds in Pakistan. When Zulfiqar Ali Bhutto quit the Ayub government in the aftermath of Indo-Pakistani War of 1965, Ahmed Raza Kasuri was so impressed by his fiery speeches that he joined his party, Pakistan Peoples Party (PPP) at its launch in 1967. Seeing his eagerness and the will to work, Bhutto appointed him as a member of the central working committee of PPP. He was elected to the National Assembly of Pakistan on Pakistan Peoples Party ticket in the 1970 Pakistani general election from a Lahore constituency.

However, Kasuri was an idealist and soon became disillusioned with Bhutto's pragmatic policies. Despite Bhutto's strong opposition to attending the National Assembly session summoned at Dhaka on 3 March 1971, Kasuri remained adamant.

Assassination of Mohammad Ahmad Kasuri
Muhammad Ahmed Khan Kasuri was allegedly murdered on the orders of Pakistani Prime Minister Zulfiqar Ali Bhutto in 1974, when the real intended murder conspiracy target was his son Ahmad Raza Khan Kasuri who escaped unhurt in the gunmen's ambush.

Zulfiqar Ali Bhutto was later arrested and convicted in 1979 by the Lahore High Court. Although formerly acquitted of this alleged murder, the "re-filed case shortly after the military coup of 5 July 1977" by Ahmad Raza Khan Kasuri, came in handy for the dictator Mohammed Zia ul Haq.

Ahmad Raza Khan Kasuri was driving and his father was sitting in the front seat when it was fired upon repeatedly in Shadman, Lahore. Kasuri showed considerable grit and drove his injured father straight to the United Christian Hospital in Gulberg, Lahore after the attack, even though his car had been blown out. He donated blood to try to save his father, but the injuries were too severe and he died that night.

On 11 November 1974, Bhutto was awakened by a telephone call. Masood Mahmood, the director-general of Federal Security Force (FSF) was at the other end and told him that Mohammad Ahmad Kasuri had been killed as his son Ahmad Raza Kasuri drove him and the family after attending a wedding party in Shadman Colony, Lahore. It was past midnight when the car was ambushed from both sides.

Mohammad Ahmad Kasuri was sitting beside his son Ahmad Raza in the front. The young Kasuri drove the car straight to United Christian Hospital, where Kasuri was pronounced dead. Although the assailants were not visible, Ahmad Raza alleged that Zulfikar Ali Bhutto was the person behind the murderous attack. The simple reason he mentioned was that he, Ahmed, was dead set against Bhutto's policies and although elected on a PPP ticket, he had become a member of the opposition party led by Asghar Khan. He was so critical of Bhutto's policies that he had not signed the 1973 Constitution.

While lodging the FIR (First information report) at the Ichhra police station in 1974, Kasuri recorded every detail of the tragic event, and when asked about the possible culprits behind the attack, Kasuri mentioned the name of Bhutto, despite the police official's opposition. Kasuri had a reason to suspect Bhutto. During his student life he was bold and outspoken and often argued with his teachers on one point or another. He argued that the ammunition used in the car ambush was only available to Bhutto's paramilitary organization. But the police closed the case as unsolvable back then.

Governor of Punjab, Pakistan, Ghulam Mustafa Khar was asked to keep Kasuri from drifting away but that did not work and Kasuri continued criticising Bhutto in the National Assembly of Pakistan. Finally Bhutto wrote to Khar and the Chief Minister of Punjab (Pakistan), Malik Meraj Khalid asking why Kasuri had not been ostracized. However, Bhutto underestimated the trouble Kasuri would create. Being a lawyer, Bhutto should have known the consequences of such an FIR; there is no understanding how he took it so lightly and continued work as usual.

On the other hand, Ahmad Raza Kasuri appeared at the National Assembly session on 20 November 1974, nine days after his father's murder. He had brought a small bottle of fluid claiming that it was his father's blood and a blood-stained shirt and announced that the government's murderous attacks on the members of parliament would be exposed. He continued in this vein for quite some time and always spoke of bad governance and injustice.

Recent political affiliations
As of 2016, Ahmed Raza Khan Kasuri is a leader of All Pakistan Muslim League headed by General Pervez Musharraf.

References

All Pakistan Muslim League politicians
Pakistani lawyers
People from Kasur District
Living people
Politicians from Punjab, Pakistan
Punjabi people
Government College University, Lahore alumni
University of the Punjab alumni
1940 births
Pakistani MNAs 1972–1977
Central Model School, Lahore alumni
People from Lahore